The Salem Armory Auditorium or Salem Armory (opened in the 1960's.) is a multipurpose arena located in Salem, Oregon, United States. It is home to the Salem Capitals of TBL.

Events
The venue has hosted concerts of bands such as Korn and Phish.

In June 2021 it was announced that the expansion team the Salem Capitals will compete at the Armory for the 2022 season. Previously the arena hosted the Salem Stampede.

References

Sports venues in Oregon
Basketball venues in Oregon
Sports in Salem, Oregon
Music venues in Oregon